Silver Swan is a Filipino condiment brand owned by NutriAsia through its subsidiary First PGMC Enterprises, Inc. It was first introduced as a soy sauce brand in 1942 by Sy Bun Suan. Later on, the brand was expanded to include vinegar, fish sauce, chili sauce and oyster sauce.

History
Established in the early 1940s, Silver Swan began its journey with the manufacture of soy sauce in Malabon. The brand name Silver Swan was derived from the name of its original owner, the late Sy Bun Suan, who set up a small-scale, family-owned venture in Manila’s Chinatown. Silver Swan has since expanded its production of condiments and food products from soy sauce to vinegar, fish sauce, salted black beans, chili sauce, hot sauce, oyster sauce, and worcestershire sauce.

Products
Silver Swan Soy Sauce
Silver Swan Sukang Puti
Silver Swan Cane Vinegar
Silver Swan Sukang-Hang (Spicy Vinegar)
Silver Swan Patis
Silver Swan Salted Black Beans
Silver Swan Old English Worschtershire Sauce
Silver Swan Oyster Sauce
Silver Swan Sweet Chili Sauce
Silver Swan Sweet Spicy Chili Sauce
Silver Swan Hot Sauce
Silver Swan Wow Sarap (All-in-One Seasoning Granules)
Silver Swan Adobo Sauce
Silver Swan Lauriat Special Soy Sauce

References

NutriAsia brands
Food brands of the Philippines
Products introduced in 1942